The Locket is a 1946 American psychological thriller with noirish undertones directed by John Brahm, starring Laraine Day, Brian Aherne, Robert Mitchum, and Gene Raymond, and released by RKO Pictures. The film is based on a screenplay by Sheridan Gibney, adapted from "What Nancy Wanted" by Norma Barzman, wife of later-blacklisted writer Ben Barzman. It is noted for its complex and confusing use of layered flashbacks within flashbacks to give psychological depth to the narrative.

Plot
A respectable looking man appears unannounced and uninvited at an upper crusty wedding at a Park Avenue residence in Manhattan. He asks for the groom, John Willis (Raymond), to be summoned. The sobriety of his appearance, speech, and manner yield acquiescence. After a cordial greeting, Harry Blair, a psychiatrist, recounts in a series of nested flashbacks a tale of Willis’ fiancé and his ex-wife Nancy (Day) being not only a kleptomaniac, inveterate liar, and murderess but unpunished for any of her crimes.

Apparently all her misdeeds trace to being falsely accused of stealing as a child. Blair recounts that Nancy first dates then splits up with an artist, Norman Clyde (Mitchum), who contacts Blair on the eve of the execution of the man convicted for a murder she committed and he helped conceal. Unaware of any of this until told by Clyde shortly into his hasty marriage to Nancy, Blair is skeptical and recommends Clyde seek counseling for his delusions. Instead Clyde plunges himself out a window of Blair’s upper story office.

Blair seeks to put the doubts Clyde sowed behind him, but discovers on his own grounds for questioning Nancy. When, five years in, he finally is faced with the truth of her serial thefts and compulsive deceits she has him fraudulently committed to a mental institution. Some unspecified time after divorcing him she becomes engaged to Willis.

It is left totally opaque whether she recognizes he's the son of the woman who had accused her of thievery, and that her childhood bete noir is set to become her mother-in-law.

In spite of Blair‘s passion recounting the unseemly details of the previous decade, an increasingly unsteady Willis remains determined to see the wedding through. The bridesmaids attend to Nancy as the ceremony nears.

Dressed in her gown and veil, Nancy is gifted a family keepsake passed down over three generations of Willis women - the same heart-shaped golden locket that had once been her downfall, now affectionately clasped around her neck by the very same woman who had tormented her.  Overwhelmed, she is beset by hallucinations of her sordid past and collapses physically and mentally during the wedding march. In the turgid aftermath she is to be committed to a mental institution, with her ex-husband counseling her fiance and his mother to show her both patience and compassion.

Cast
 Laraine Day as Nancy Monks Blair Patton
 Brian Aherne as Dr. Harry Blair
 Robert Mitchum as Norman Clyde
 Gene Raymond as John Willis
 Sharyn Moffett as Nancy, age 10
 Ricardo Cortez as Drew Bonner
 Katherine Emery as Mrs. Willis
 Helene Thimig as Mrs. Monks
 Reginald Denny as Mr. Wendell
 Nella Walker as Mrs. Wendell
 Henry Stephenson as Lord Wyndham
 Lillian Fontaine as Lady Wyndham
 Myrna Dell as Thelma
 Wyndham Standing as Butler (uncredited)

Background
 Hume Cronyn originally bought the Norma Barzman screenplay to produce and direct the film with his wife Jessica Tandy in the lead role, but later sold the rights to RKO Pictures, which then assigned Gibney to rewrite the screenplay. The original Barzman screenplay is in the Cronyn-Tandy papers at the Library of Congress.
 The interiors used for the house of Mrs. Willis appear to be the same as those used for the house of Alex Sebastian (Claude Rains) in Alfred Hitchcock's Notorious, released by RKO in September 1946.

Reception

Critical response
When the film was released the staff at Variety magazine praised the film, writing, "Story carries the flashback technique to greater lengths than generally employed. The writing by Sheridan Gibney displays an understanding of the subject matter and proves a solid basis for the able performances achieved by John Brahm’s direction. Latter gears his scenes for full interest and carefully carries forward the doubt – and audience hope – that Nancy is not the villainess."

In 1992 film historians Alain Silver and Elizabeth Ward praised the unusual melodrama in the RKO visual style. "It is distinctive in its flashbacks within flashbacks, with the story often being told by a third or fourth person removed. This device is handled effectively in preparation for the climactic flashback, which reveals the truth."

Contemporary film critic Dennis Schwartz gave the film a mixed review in 2006, writing, "A psychological drama about a woman with a dark secret from her childhood that is carried over to her adult life. It's a post-war baroque melodrama, creaky as wooden steps in a mildewed house ... It was too wooden a presentation to generate anything but a few sparks ... It's a somber story, with a lot of heavy-handed things going on. The complexities of the heroine's character were well presented. The analyst's comments about her stealing to get even with Mrs. Willis seemed to be a reasonable explanation, if taken at face value ... The Locket only had some glitter but not enough substance. Though, as muddled as it was, it still kept me alert wanting to know what gives. The problem is I never satisfactorily found out what gives."

References

Bibliography
George Toles, "The Gift of Amnesia in John Brahm's The Locket" in the Film and the Romantic special issue, Jeffrey Crouse (ed.), Film International, Vol. 7, No. 6, December 2009, pp. 32–55.

External links
 
 
 
 The Locket informational site and DVD review at DVD Beaver (includes images)
 The Locket analysis by author Wheeler Winston Dixon at Film Noir of the Week
 

1946 films
1946 drama films
American black-and-white films
Film noir
Films scored by Roy Webb
Films directed by John Brahm
Films set in 1938
Films set in London
American drama films
1940s English-language films
1940s American films